The 2006–07 Primeira Liga (also known as BWINLIGA for sponsorship reasons) was the 73rd edition of top flight of Portuguese football. It started on 27 August 2006 with a match between Vitória de Setúbal and Académica and ended on 20 May 2007. The league was contested by 16 clubs, with Porto as defending champions.

Porto and Sporting CP were both qualified for the 2007–08 UEFA Champions League group stage, while Benfica qualified for the UEFA Champions League qualifying round. Braga, Belenenses and Paços de Ferreira qualified for the 2007–08 UEFA Cup. Beira-Mar and Desportivo das Aves were relegated to the Liga de Honra. Liédson was the top scorer with 15 goals.

Promotion and relegation

Teams relegated to Liga de Honra 
Penafiel
Rio Ave
Vitória de Guimarães
Gil Vicente

The professional competitions shrunk from 18 to 16 clubs following last season's promotions and relegations' modifications. Penafiel, Rio Ave, Vitória de Guimarães were relegated to the Liga de Honra.

In June 2006, Belenenses, who finished 15th in the previous season, were scheduled to be relegated. However, the Lisbon team presented a complaint to the Portuguese League for Professional Football regarding the use of a non-registered player (Mateus) by 13th-placed Gil Vicente. The penalty pretended by Belenenses would result in Gil Vicente being relegated in their place. This claim generated a series of appeals and controversial statements to the media. The decision has been taken on 23 August and made Belenenses stay in the Portuguese Liga while Gil Vicente were relegated to the Liga de Honra.

Teams promoted from Liga de Honra 
Beira-Mar
Desportivo das Aves

Beira-Mar and Desportivo das Aves were promoted to the Liga.

Club information

League table

Results

Monthly awards

SJPF Player of the Month

SJPF Young Player of the Month

Season statistics

Top goalscorers

See also 
Liga de Honra 2006-07
2006–07 Portuguese football season

References

External links 
Portuguese Liga 2006-07 at rsssf.com

Primeira Liga seasons
Port
1